The 1976 United States presidential election in Colorado took place on November 2, 1976, as part of the 1976 United States presidential election. Voters chose seven representatives, or electors, to the Electoral College, who voted for president and vice president.
 
Colorado was won by incumbent President Gerald Ford (R–Michigan) with 54.05% of the popular vote, against Jimmy Carter (D–Georgia), with 42.58% of the popular vote. Like most of the Mountain West, Colorado was comfortably in Ford's column; Colorado was Ford's ninth-best state overall (and one of only nine which he won by double digits). Ford held Carter's margin in the city of Denver to 2.8%, and rolled up large margins in the reliably Republican suburban Denver-area counties of Jefferson and Arapahoe. He also ran well in Boulder County, at the time a traditionally Republican county; he would be the last Republican apart from Reagan in his 1984 landslide to win a majority in the county. Despite the large national swing in favor of the Democrats, Ford even took back Pitkin County, which had supported McGovern in 1972.

Nevertheless, Carter showed some strength in some rural parts of Colorado that later Democrats would fail to replicate. As of the 2020 presidential election, this was the last occasion on which Dolores County, Prowers County, Phillips County, and Cheyenne County voted for a Democratic presidential candidate.

None of the third-party candidates amounted to a significant portion of the vote, but Eugene McCarthy (I–Minnesota) won 2.41% of the popular vote, proportionally significantly ahead of his national 0.91%. This was the first presidential election in which Colorado recorded one million votes.

Despite losing in Colorado, Carter went on to win the national election and became the 39th president of the United States. Colorado had previously voted Republican fifteen times, Democratic nine times, and Populist once (for James B. Weaver in 1892).

Results

Results by county

References

Colorado
1976
1976 Colorado elections